= Main Chala =

Bollywood song

"Main Chala"is an Indian Hindi-language Bollywood song by Guru Randhawa and Iulia Vantur. When the song was released, it received millions of views in a few minutes. A new music video titled Main Chala, starring actors Salman Khan and Pragya Jaiswal, was released online. It also features artists Guru Randhawa and Iulia Vantur. A music video featuring Bollywood star Salman Khan and Pragya Jaiswal has been released. 'Main Chala' is a love music video featuring Lulia Vantur and Guru Randhawa, who have sung the song.
